Eagle Creek Airpark  is a public use airport located seven nautical miles (13 km) west of the central business district of Indianapolis, a city in Marion County, Indiana, United States. It is owned by the Indianapolis Airport Authority and serves as a reliever airport for Indianapolis International Airport.

Although most U.S. airports use the same three-letter location identifier for the FAA and IATA, this airport is assigned EYE by the FAA but has no designation from the IATA.

Facilities and aircraft 
It has one asphalt paved runway designated 3/21 which measures 4,205 by 75 feet (1,282 x 23 m).

For the 12-month period ending December 31, 2015, the airport had 21,879 aircraft operations, an average of 60 per day: 94% general aviation and 6% air taxi. In June 2018, there were 100 aircraft based at this airport: 78 single-engine, 17 multi-engine, and 5 jet.

Eagle Creek Aviation Services, the airport's fixed-base operator (FBO) is an authorized service center for Cessna Citation, Cirrus Design and Twin Commander aircraft. ECAS is also one of the eight U.S. service centers for the Embraer Phenom.

References

External links 
 Eagle Creek Airpark, official page from Indianapolis Airport Authority
 Aerial photo from Indiana Department of Transportation
 Aerial photo at Airliners.net
 

Airports in Indiana
Transportation in Indianapolis
Transportation buildings and structures in Marion County, Indiana